Jucha is an extinct genus of plesiosaur found in the Hauterivian (Early Cretaceous) Klimovka Formation of Russia. The type species, J. squalea, was one of the basalmost and oldest definitive elasmosaurs known to date (it may have been the oldest considering the Late Triassic Alexeyisaurus was not an elasmosaur).

Discovery and naming
The holotype, housed on display at the Undorov Pleontological Museum, was discovered in 2007 in a layer of the Klimovka Formation in the vicinity of the Slantsevy Rudnik village near Ulyanovsk, European Russia. The holotype was preserved in a mineral crust composed of mainly pyrite, hence the epithet name squalea (the genus is named after Jucha, a girl in Turkic demonology who has snake skin and can turn into a dragon, having lived for a thousand years, and while caring for his hair, he can take off his head - this is how the lack of a skull in the holotype played a role in the etymology of the genus name). The species Jucha squalea was described in 2020 by Fisher et al.

The holotype consists of 17 cervical vertebrae, 9 dorsal vertebrae and one isolated neural spine, four caudal vertebrae and parts of the forelimbs and hindlimbs.

Description

References 

Elasmosaurids
Fossil taxa described in 2020
Sauropterygian genera